Francesco Borgani (1587–1624) was an Italian painter of the Baroque, mainly active in Mantua.

He was a pupil of Ippolito Costa and influenced by his contemporary Domenico Fetti. He was employed by the court of the Duke Vincenzo I Gonzaga. The  painting  of St. Francis intercedes with the Virgin to liberate Mantua from the plague of 1630 for the church of Santa Agnese, but now in the Ducal Palace of Mantua, was attributed to him, but given the date of demise that seems unlikely. He painted for the churches of San Pietro, San Simone, and Santa Croce at Mantua.

References

16th-century Italian painters
Italian male painters
17th-century Italian painters
Painters from Mantua
Italian Baroque painters
Year of death unknown
1587 births